Rhacophorus tuberculatus is a species of frog in the family Rhacophoridae found in eastern and northeastern  India (Arunachal Pradesh, Assam, Meghalaya, and West Bengal) and southeastern Tibet, China. It is known from tropical moist forests and bamboo forests. Breeding has been observed from bushes near to small forest ponds. It may hide in bamboo stems during the day. The species is threatened by habitat loss.

References

tuberculatus
Frogs of India
Amphibians of China
Fauna of Tibet
Amphibians described in 1871
Taxa named by John Anderson (zoologist)
Taxonomy articles created by Polbot